The New Yorker was a fireboat operated by the Fire Department of New York City from 1890 to 1931.

Her pumps were capable of projecting 13,000 gallons per minute.

Operational career

On January 18, 1909, the crew of The New Yorker rescued a young woman who had slipped on the ice on the seawall near their boat, and fallen into the river.  Two observers had jumped in after Albertine Decquer, and the fireboat's crew rescued all three.

On June 9, 1922, The New Yorker rescued Fannie Schecht, a well-dressed young woman who was seen trying to make her way to shore, in the middle of the Hudson.

See also
 Fireboats in New York City

References 

Fireboats of New York City
1890 ships
Ships built in New York City